Aslan Duz County is in Ardabil province, Iran. The capital of the county is the city of Aslan Duz. At the 2006 census, the region's population (as Aslan Duz District of Parsabad County) was 27,418 in 5,220 households. The following census in 2011 counted 27,583 people in 6,663 households. At the 2016 census, the district's population was 32,506 in 8,898 households. It was separated from the county in 2018 to become Aslan Duz County.

Administrative divisions

The population history of Aslan Duz County's administrative divisions (as a district of Parsabad County) over three consecutive censuses is shown in the following table.

References

 

Counties of Ardabil Province